Ryerss Mansion, also known as Burholme Mansion, is a historic mansion in the Fox Chase neighborhood of Philadelphia, Pennsylvania.

The house was built on 85 acres by merchant Joseph Waln Ryerss in 1859 overlooking Burholme Park, one of the highest vistas in Philadelphia. Joseph was president of the Tioga Railroad and followed the family business of trading with China, Japan, and England. He also followed the family avocation of collecting art, especially oriental art.

Joseph died in 1868 leaving the house to his second wife Anne, and following her death, to his son Robert.

Robert also traveled and collected art which he displayed in the house. Less than a year before he died at age 65, Robert married his longtime housekeeper, Mary Ann Reed. She inherited a comfortable annuity and the house, with the house to be given to the City of Philadelphia after her death.  She remarried three years after his death to the Reverend John G. Bawn and they continued the family avocations of traveling and art collecting.  In 1905 she turned the house over to the city and it opened as a park, museum, and library in 1910 “Free to the people forever” under the administration of the Fairmount Park Commission.  Mrs. Ryerss Bawn died in 1916 in China.

The Reverend Bawn then returned to Philadelphia and lobbied the city to build more galleries to house the now larger collection.  These galleries were built in 1923.

References

External links

Official site at Fairmount Park
Listing, drawings, and photographs at the Historic American Buildings Survey
Listing at Philadelphia Architects and Buildings

Art museums and galleries in Pennsylvania
Decorative arts museums in the United States
Historic house museums in Philadelphia
Houses completed in 1859
Houses on the National Register of Historic Places in Philadelphia
Libraries in Pennsylvania
Museums in Philadelphia
Fox Chase, Philadelphia
1859 establishments in Pennsylvania